An elevator test tower is a structure usually 100 to over 200 metres (300 feet to over 600 feet) tall that is designed to evaluate the stress and fatigue limits of specific elevator cars in a controlled environment.  Tests are also carried out in the test tower to ensure reliability and safety in current elevator designs and address any failures that may arise.  Examples of an elevator test tower are the National Lift Tower in Northampton, England, the  Solae Tower in Inazawa, Japan, and the Rottweil Test Tower in Germany (owned by ThyssenKrupp).

In 1888, Otis completed an elevator test tower at their factory in Yonkers, New York; this was possibly the first elevator test tower in the United States.

See also
 List of elevator test towers

References

Towers
Test Tower